Kutepov is a Russian masculine surname, its feminine counterpart is Kutepova. In the Russian Empire a noble family of Kutepovs that has Turkic roots was inscribed in ancestral book of the Oryol Governorate.

It may refer to
Alexander Kutepov (1882–1930), Russian Imperial army general
Ihor Kutepov (born 1965), Ukrainian football player
Ilya Kutepov (born 1993), Russian football player
Nikolai Kutepov (1851–1907), Russian writer
Polina Kutepova (born 1971), Russian actress

Russian-language surnames